Senator Biddle may refer to:

Charles Biddle (1745–1821), Pennsylvania State Senate
Nicholas Biddle (1786–1844), Pennsylvania State Senate
Ward Gray Biddle (1891–1946), Indiana State Senate